I Cover the War is a 1937 American drama action film directed by Arthur Lubin for Universal Pictures, starring John Wayne. It was one of a series of non-Westerns Wayne made for Universal.

Plot
Two newsreel cameramen (John Wayne, Don Barclay) are sent to photograph a bandit sheik in the desert.

Cast
 John Wayne as Bob Adams
 Gwen Gaze as Pamela Armitage
 Don Barclay as Elmer Davis
 Charles Brokaw as El Kadar / Muffadi
 James Bush as Don Adams
 Pat Somerset as Captain Archie Culvert
 Richard Tucker Army Officer
 Sam Harris as Colonel Hugh Armitage (as Major Sam Harris)
 Olaf Hytten as Sir Herbert
 Arthur Aylesworth as Logan
 Franklin Parker as Parker (as Franklyn Paker)

Production
In February 1937 Trem Carr announced the film would start March 1.

Reception
The New York Times called it an "ingeniously romantic fable".

See also
 John Wayne filmography

References

External links

I Cover the War t BFI

1937 films
1937 drama films
1930s war drama films
American war drama films
American black-and-white films
Films directed by Arthur Lubin
1930s English-language films
Films about war correspondents
Films set in deserts
Films with screenplays by Bernard McConville
Universal Pictures films
1930s American films